The Witch Tree as it is commonly known, also called Manidoo-giizhikens, or Little Cedar Spirit Tree by the Ojibwe First Nation tribe is an ancient Thuja occidentalis (Eastern White Cedar) growing on the shore of Lake Superior in Cook County, Minnesota.  The earliest written records of the tree by Europeans in the Americas are by French explorer Sieur de la Verendrye in 1731, who commented on the tree as a mature tree at that time, making it over 300 years old.  The tree is held sacred by the Ojibwe, who traditionally leave offerings of tobacco to ensure a safe journey on Lake Superior.  Due to its sacred nature and vandalism problems in the past, the tree is considered off limits to visitors unless accompanied by a local Ojibwe band member.

The tree is small for a mature conifer, as it is growing out of bare rock on the shoreline.  Its gnarled, stunted, and twisting branches have been the subject of many photographs.

See also
 List of individual trees
 Grand Portage National Monument

References

External links 
 Historic places named by 2007 MN statute
 Minnesota Public Radio feature
 OpenLearn: The Virtual Arboretum - Manidoo-giizhikens or the Spirit Little Cedar Tree

Native American history of Minnesota
Cook County, Minnesota
Individual conifers
Religious places of the indigenous peoples of North America
Ojibwe culture
Trees in religion
Individual trees in the United States
Landmarks in Minnesota